"Uzi (Pinky Ring)" is a song from Iron Flag, the fourth album by rap group Wu-Tang Clan.  It was released as the album's first single, produced by GZA with an accompanying music video directed by RZA.

The song was listed as the 322nd best song of the 2000s by Pitchfork.

Track listing
12"
 "Pinky Ring" (radio edit) – 5:23
 "Pinky Ring" (instrumental) – 5:23
 "Pinky Ring" (dirty) – 5:23
 "Pinky Ring" (late night mix) – 5:23
 "Pinky Ring" (a cappella) – 4:09
Promo, vinyl
 "Pinky Ring" (radio edit) – 5:23
 "Pinky Ring" (instrumental) – 5:23
 "Pinky Ring" (album version) – 4:53
 "Y'all Been Warned" (radio edit) – 4:14
 "Y'all Been Warned" (instrumental) – 4:14
 "Y'all Been Warned" (album version) – 4:14

2001 songs
Wu-Tang Clan songs
Song recordings produced by RZA
Hardcore hip hop songs
Songs written by Method Man
Loud Records singles
Songs written by Ghostface Killah
Songs written by RZA
Songs written by Raekwon
Songs written by Ol' Dirty Bastard